Mara Hvistendahl is an American writer. Her book Unnatural Selection was a finalist for the 2012 Pulitzer Prize for General Non-Fiction.

She graduated from Swarthmore College in Pennsylvania and Columbia University in New York City. She is former contributor for Science magazine. Her work has appeared in The Atlantic, The Wall Street Journal, Popular Science, The Intercept and Foreign Policy.

Works
 
And The City Swallowed Them, Deca
''The Scientist and The Spy: A True Story of China, the FBI, and Industrial Espionage. New York: Riverhead, 2020.

References

External links

Q&A with Mara Hvistendahl, author of And the City Swallowed Them

Living people
21st-century American essayists
American science writers
Writers from Minnesota
Year of birth missing (living people)
American women essayists
Women science writers
Swarthmore College alumni
Columbia University alumni
21st-century American women writers